Alexandromys is a subgenus of voles in the genus Microtus. Species in this subgenus are:
Clarke's vole (Microtus clarkei)
Evorsk vole (Microtus evoronensis)
Reed vole (Microtus fortis)
Gerbe's vole (Microtus gerbei)
Taiwan vole (Microtus kikuchii)
Lacustrine vole (Microtus limnophilus)
Maximowicz's vole (Microtus maximowiczii)
Middendorf's vole (Microtus middendorffi)
Mongolian vole (Microtus mongolicus)
Japanese grass vole (Microtus montebelli)
Muisk vole (Microtus mujanensis)
Tundra vole or root vole (Microtus oeconomus)
Subspecies Microtus oeconomus arenicola
Sakhalin vole (Microtus sachalinensis)

References

D.E. Wilson & D.M. Reeder, 2005: Mammal Species of the World: A Taxonomic and Geographic Reference. Third Edition. The Johns Hopkins University Press, Baltimore.

Microtus
Taxa named by Sergej Ognew
Animal subgenera